Jakub Galvas (born 15 June 1999) is a Czech professional ice hockey defenseman who currently plays with the Rockford IceHogs in the American Hockey League (AHL) as a prospect for the Chicago Blackhawks of the National Hockey League (NHL). Galvas was selected 150th overall (5th round) by the Blackhawks in the 2017 NHL Entry Draft.

Playing career 
Galvas scored one goal in 36 games for HC Olomouc of the Czech Extraliga during the 2016–17 season.  During that season, he played against his father Lukas Galvas, the first time father and son played a game against one another in league history.

In the following 2017–18 season, Galvas was paired defensively alongside his father who joined Olomouc as a free agent for his last professional season. He established new career highs with Olomouc, recording 2 goals and 13 points in 42 games.

While improving his offensive totals in each of his three seasons with Olomouc, Galvas left following the 2018–19 season to continue his development by agreeing to a two-year contract with Finnish Liiga club, Mikkelin Jukurit, on 15 May 2019.

After two seasons in the Liiga with Jukurit, Galvas was signed by draft club, the Chicago Blackhawks, to a two-year, entry-level contract on 7 May 2021.

On January 11, 2022, in his NHL debut, the rookie defenseman played 23:40 against the Columbus Blue Jackets, the second-most among Blackhawks skaters, which included 1:51 on the penalty kill.

International play

 

Galvas was part of the winning Czech team at the 2016 Ivan Hlinka Memorial Tournament. He contributed offensively with 2 goals and 5 points in as many games.

Galvas represented the Czech Republic at the 2017 IIHF World U18 Championships and at the 2018 World Junior Ice Hockey Championships.

Career statistics

Regular season and playoffs

International

References

External links

1999 births
Living people
Chicago Blackhawks draft picks
Chicago Blackhawks players
Czech ice hockey defencemen
HC Dukla Jihlava players
Mikkelin Jukurit players
HC Olomouc players
Sportspeople from Ostrava
Rockford IceHogs (AHL) players
Czech expatriate ice hockey players in the United States
Czech expatriate ice hockey players in Finland